Wisukam Narueman Bridge (RTGS: Saphan Wisukam Narueman) is an historic bridge of Bangkok located in the border of Bang Khun Phrom sub-district, Phra Nakhon district and Dusit sub-district, Dusit district.

King Chulalongkorn (Rama V) ordered the Department of Public Works to build the bridge across Khlong Phadung Krung Kasem (Phadung Krung Kasem canal) linking to Prachathipatai road. It was named "Wisukam Narueman" (translates as The  Bridge was Built by Vishvakarman), and opened in 1901. At first it was built of iron structure with wooden pavement and cast iron balustrade. Later, in 1967 it was restored expanded and changed into reinforced concrete. The bridge walls are of concrete balustrade with the bridge's name as Witsukam Narueman (วิศสุกรรมนฤมาณ), which is different spelling from the king's given name, and the year of restoration (1967) inscribed at the center. It's one of the bridge with the name of deity (Thewet Naruemit Bridge, Wisukam Narueman Bridge, Makkhawan Rangsan Bridge, Thewakam Rangrak Bridge and Jaturapak Rangsarit Bridge, respectively).

References 

Bridges in Bangkok
Dusit district
Phra Nakhon district
Bridges completed in 1901